Robert Kok (born 26 June 1957 in Amsterdam) is a Dutch former footballer who played as striker for AFC AJAX Amsterdam in the Netherlands, clubs in Belgium and clubs in Switzerland from the late 1970s until the early 1990s.

Kok began his career with AJAX Amsterdam, playing for the Dutch club from 1967 until 1977. He then moved to K. Boom F.C. in Belgium and played there until 1978, when he signed for Lierse S.K. The following season, he moved to Switzerland with FC Lausanne-Sport where he stayed until signing for Servette FC in 1984. In 1988, FC Zürich acquired his services.

Kok joined Basel during the winter break of their 1991–92 season under head coach Ernst August Künnecke. After playing in three test games Epars played his domestic league debut for his new club in the home game in the St. Jakob Stadium on 1 March 1992 as Basel played a 1–1 draw with Yverdon-Sports. He scored his first goal for the club on 4 April in the home game as Basel played a 3–3 draw with Baden.

Kok stayed with the club until the end of the season, after which he ended his professional career. During this time he played a total of 19 games for Basel scoring a total of two goals. 13 of these games were in the Nationalliga A, three in the Swiss Cup and three were friendly games. He scored one goal in the domestic league, the other was scored during the test games.

Honours

Club
Lausanne-Sport
Swiss Cup: 1980–81

Servette
Swiss Super League: 1984–85

Individual 
 Swiss Foreign Footballer of the Year: 1980–81

References

External links
 

1957 births
Living people
Footballers from Amsterdam
Dutch footballers
Dutch expatriate footballers
Lierse S.K. players
FC Lausanne-Sport players
Servette FC players
FC Zürich players
FC Basel players
Swiss Super League players
Expatriate footballers in Belgium
Expatriate footballers in Switzerland
Association football forwards
K. Boom F.C. players